White collar may refer to:

 White-collar worker, a salaried professional or an educated worker who performs semi-professional office, administrative, and sales-coordination tasks, as opposed to a blue-collar worker, whose job requires manual labor 
 White-collar crime, a non-violent crime, generally for personal gain and often involving money
 White Collar: The American Middle Classes, a study of the American middle class by sociologist C. Wright Mills
 White Collar (TV series), a police-procedural, dramatic television series starring Matt Bomer that premiered on the USA Network in 2009
 "White Collar", an episode of the sitcom The King of Queens
 The White Collar (novel), a novel by Mikheil Javakhishvili